Beginning shortly after the city's incorporation as a city in 1846, elections have been held in the mayor of Manchester, New Hampshire. The following article provides information on the elections for mayor in the city during the 21st century.

Election laws and history
The city of Manchester, New Hampshire held its first mayoral election in 1846.

The city's mayoral elections are currently are nonpartisan, a change which was adopted before the 1997 election. While, prior to 1997, elections had long been partisan, there had been stretches previous to 1999 in which the city's mayoral elections had been nonpartisan, including the stretch of four elections held from 1953 through 1959.

Under current election laws, to be eligible to be elected mayor, one must be a resident of the city for at least one year prior to filing for the office of mayor.

Elections throughout the 20th century have been for two-years terms, as has been the case in the city since the 1880 election.

There are no term limits.

2001

The 2001 Manchester, New Hampshire mayoral election was held on November 6, 2001, to elect the mayor of Manchester, New Hampshire. It saw the reelection of Robert A. Baines.

The election was formally nonpartisan.

Before the general election, a nonpartisan primary election was held on September 18, 2001, to determine the two candidates who would appear on the general election ballot. The general and primary elections both coincided with those for the Manchester Board of Aldermen and welfare commissioner. The general election also coincided with a school board election and two ballot questions.

Candidates
Robert A. Baines, incumbent mayor since 2000
Richard Girard, alderman since 1998
Joseph Kelly Levasseur

Results
Primary election

General election

2003

The 2003 Manchester, New Hampshire mayoral election was held on November 4, 2003, to elect the mayor of Manchester, New Hampshire. It saw the reelection of Robert A. Baines to a third consecutive term.

The election was formally nonpartisan. The election coincided with that for the Manchester Board of Aldermen. Before the general election, a nonpartisan primary election was held on September 16, 2003, to determine the two candidates who would appear on the general election ballot.

Candidates
Robert A. Baines, incumbent mayor since 2000
Jane Beaulieu
Carlos Gonzalez
Robert A. Howe
Jeff Kassel
Robert F. Shaw, former mayor (1984–1987), candidate for the Republican nomination in the 1988 New Hampshire gubernatorial election, Democratic nominee in the 1995 mayoral election, candidate in the 1997 mayoral election
"D.R." Soucy

While the election was formally nonpartisan, some candidates had publicly-known political affiliations. Baines and Shaw were both Democrats. Carlos Gonzalez was a Republican.

Gonzalez was the first hispanic mayoral candidate in the city's history.

Results
Primary election

General election

2005

The 2005 Manchester, New Hampshire mayoral election was held on November 8, 2005, to elect the mayor of Manchester, New Hampshire. It saw Frank Guinta unseat the incumbent mayor Robert A. Baines.
The election was formally nonpartisan.

Before the general election, a nonpartisan primary election was held on September 20, 2005, to determine the two candidates who would appear on the general election ballot. The general and primary elections both coincided with those for the Manchester Board of Aldermen.

Candidates
Robert A. Baines, incumbent mayor since 2000
Frank Guinta, alderman since 2002
Jeff Kassel

Results
Primary election

General election

2007

The 2007 Manchester, New Hampshire mayoral election was held on November 6, 2007, to elect the mayor of Manchester, New Hampshire. It saw incumbent mayor Frank Guinta win reelection.

The election was formally nonpartisan.

Before the general election, a nonpartisan primary election was held on September 18, 2007, to determine the two candidates who would appear on the general election ballot. The general and primary elections both coincided with those for the Manchester Board of Aldermen.

Candidates
Jane Beaulieu, member of the New Hampshire House of Representatives since 2007 and candidate for mayor in 2003
Caitlin Curran
Tom Donovan, former chair of the Manchester School Board Finance Committee
Katherine Gatsas
Frank Guinta, incumbent mayor since 2006
Joseph Kelly Levasseur

Campaign

Shortly after announcing his candidacy, Donovan received the endorsement of Chris Dodd, United States senator from Connecticut and candidate for the Democratic presidential nomination.

In the general election, Donovan was elected by Teamsters Local 633.

Results
Primary election

General election

2009

The 2009 Manchester, New Hampshire mayoral election was held on November 3, 2009, to elect the mayor of Manchester, New Hampshire. Alderman and State Senator Ted Gatsas defeated Alderman Mark Roy by a margin of 56% to 43% in the November 3 general election.

Before the general election, a nonpartisan primary election was held on September 15, 2009, to determine the two candidates that would appear on the general election ballot. The primary and general elections both coincided with those for the Manchester Board of Aldermen.

Background
Manchester's mayoral elections are non-partisan, occur every two years, and there are no term limits. The incumbent mayor, Frank Guinta, had served since 2006. Guinta stated in the spring of 2009 that he would not run for reelection and subsequently announced that he would run to represent New Hampshire's 1st congressional district in the United States House of Representatives in 2010 challenging incumbent Carol Shea-Porter.

Candidates
Ran
Ted Gatsas, current Alderman and State Senator
Richard Komi, current State Representative
Glenn Ouellette, current Public-access television producer
Mark Roy, current Alderman for Ward 1
Bobby Stephen, former State Senator

Declined
Tom Donovan, 2007 mayoral candidate and former school board member (endorsed Mark Roy)
Michael Lopez, current Alderman At-Large

Results
Primary election

General election

2011

The 2011 Manchester, New Hampshire mayoral election was held on November 8, 2011, to elect the mayor of Manchester, New Hampshire. It saw incumbent mayor Ted Gatsas win reelection. The election coincided with those for the Manchester Board of Aldermen.

Candidates
Ted Gatsas, incumbent mayor since 2010
Chris Herbert, ward 4 representative to the Manchester Board of School Committee and 1999 candidate in the Republican primary for New Hampshire State Senate district 20

Results

2013

The 2013 Manchester, New Hampshire mayoral election was held on November 5, 2003, to elect the mayor of Manchester, New Hampshire. Incumbent mayor Ted Gatsas won reelection to a third consecutive term. He defeated city alderman Patrick Arnold. While the election was formally nonpartisan, Arnold was a known Democrat and Gatsas was a known Republican.

Before the general election, a nonpartisan primary election was held on September 17, 2013, to determine the two candidates that would appear on the general election ballot. The primary and general elections both coincided with those for the Manchester Board of Aldermen.

Candidates
Patrick Arnold, alderman since 2009
Ted Gatsas, incumbent mayor since 2010
Glenn RJ. Ouellette, perennial candidate

Results
Primary election

General election

2015

The 2015 Manchester, New Hampshire mayoral election was held on November 3, 2015, to elect the mayor of Manchester, New Hampshire. It saw the reelection of Ted Gatsas, a member of the Republican Party, to his fourth consecutive term. The election was incredibly narrow, with Gatsas winning by a mere 85 votes.

The election was formally nonpartisan.

Prior to the general election, a nonpartisan primary election was held on September 15, 2015, to select the two candidates who appeared on the ballot in the general election.

Candidates
Patrick Arnold, former city alderman (2009–2014) and 2013 mayoral candidate 
Joyce Craig, city alderman
Ted Gatsas, incumbent mayor
Glenn RJ. Ouellette, perennial candidate
Alibaba Shaikh

While the election was formally nonpartisan, numerous candidates had publicly-known political affiliations. For instance, Arnold was a known Democrat and Gatsas was a known Republican.

Results
Primary election

General election
The original unofficial count saw Gatsas leading by a 75-vote margin. After a recount, Gatsas was found to have indeed won the election.

2017

The 2019 Manchester, New Hampshire mayoral election was held on November 7, 2019, to elect the mayor of Manchester, New Hampshire. It saw the election of Joyce Craig, a member of the Democratic Party, to her first term, unseating Republican incumbent Ted Gatsas. Craig became the city's first female mayor.

The election was formally nonpartisan.

Prior to the general election, a nonpartisan primary election was held on September 19, 2017, to select the two candidates who appeared on the ballot in the general election.

Background
Though Manchester's municipal elections are officially nonpartisan, candidates tend to associate themselves with either the Democratic Party or Republican Party. Ted Gatsas, a member of the Republican Party, had been mayor since 2010. Former Manchester alderman Joyce Craig, a member of the Democratic Party, had previously challenged Gatsas in 2015. In the 2016 presidential election, Democratic nominee Hillary Clinton received around 3,000 more votes than Republican nominee Donald Trump in Manchester.

Campaign
Gatsas announced in June 2017 that he would seek a fifth term. Craig also filed her candidacy in June 2017. Joshua Dallaire and perennial candidate Glenn Ouellette also ran.

Craig and Gatsas placed first and second respectively in the primary election and advanced to the general election.

Craig received support from Democratic politicians including Joe Biden, Eric Garcetti, Martin O'Malley and Tim Ryan.

Results
Primary election

General election

Aftermath
New Hampshire's U.S. Senators Jeanne Shaheen and Maggie Hassan praised Craig's election as Manchester's first female mayor. Craig was sworn in on January 2, 2018. Gatsas was elected to the Executive Council of New Hampshire in 2018 and re-elected in 2020.

2019

The 2019 Manchester, New Hampshire mayoral election was held on November 7, 2019, to elect the mayor of Manchester, New Hampshire. It saw the reelection of Joyce Craig, a member of the Democratic Party.

Prior to the general election, a nonpartisan primary election was held on September 17, 2019, to select the two candidates to be included on the general election ballot.

Background
Though Manchester's municipal elections are officially nonpartisan, candidates tend to associate themselves with either the Democratic Party or Republican Party. Victoria Sullivan, a member of the Republican Party, had been a two-term member of the New Hampshire House of Representatives. Incumbent mayor and former Manchester alderman Joyce Craig, a member of the Democratic Party, had previously unsuccessfully challenged former mayor Ted Gatsas in 2015 and won against him in a 2017 rematch. In the 2016 presidential election, Democratic nominee Hillary Clinton received around 3,000 more votes than Republican nominee Donald Trump in Manchester.

Campaign
Craig announced in April 2019 that she would seek a second term. Sullivan also filed her candidacy in April 2019. Joshua Dallaire and Independent perennial candidate Glenn Ouellette also ran.

Craig and Sullivan placed first and second respectively in the primary election and advanced to the general election.

Craig received support from Democratic politicians including U.S. Representative Chris Pappas, U.S. Senator Jeanne Shaheen, and U.S. Senator Maggie Hassan.

Results
Primary election

General election

2021

The 2021 Manchester, New Hampshire mayoral election was held on November 2, 2021. This election saw incumbent mayor Joyce Craig, a member of the Democratic Party, re-elected to a third term. Members of the Board of Aldermen, Board of School Committee, Ward Moderators, Clerks and Selectmen were also elected on November 2 in coinciding elections.

Background
Though Manchester's municipal elections are officially nonpartisan, candidates tend to associate themselves with either the Democratic Party or Republican Party. Victoria Sullivan, a member of the Republican Party, had been a two-term member of the New Hampshire House of Representatives and previously ran in the 2019 Manchester, New Hampshire mayoral election. Richard Girard, a member of the Republican Party, is a former alderman and former at-large representative on the Manchester School District school board who previously ran for mayor in 2001. Incumbent mayor and former Manchester alderman Joyce Craig, a member of the Democratic Party, had previously unseated former mayor Ted Gatsas in a 2017 rematch after to losing to him in 2015. She had won re-election to a second term in the 2019 Manchester, New Hampshire mayoral election against Victoria Sullivan.

In the 2020 presidential election, the Democratic ticket of Joe Biden and Kamala Harris received 29,464 votes in Manchester, while the Republican ticket of Donald Trump and Mike Pence received 22,127 and the Libertarian ticket of Jo Jorgensen and Spike Cohen received 1,015 votes.

Candidates

Declared 
Joyce Craig, incumbent mayor
Victoria Sullivan, former New Hampshire state representative and 2019 mayoral candidate
Richard Girard, radio host, former alderman, former school board member, 2001 mayoral candidate

Declined
Ted Gatsas, New Hampshire Executive councilor and former mayor

Campaign
Victoria Sullivan announced a run for mayor in April 2021. Craig also announced in April 2021 that she would seek a third term. Richard Girard, who was a former alderman and former at-large representative on the Manchester School District school board announced he would be running in April 2021 as well.

After the primary, third-place finisher Richard Girard requested a recount.

Endorsements

Results
Primary election

General election

2023

The 2023 Manchester, New Hampshire mayoral election will be held on November 7, 2023. The incumbent mayor Joyce Craig, a member of the Democratic Party, has yet to announce her plans for this election cycle. Members of the Board of Aldermen, Board of School Committee, Ward Moderators, Clerks and Selectmen will also be elected on November 7 in coinciding elections.

Background
Though Manchester's municipal elections are officially nonpartisan, candidates tend to associate themselves with either the Democratic Party or Republican Party. Jay Ruais, a member of the Republican Party, is serving as an infantry officer for the New Hampshire Army National Guard and had previously worked as chief of staff for former U.S. Representative Frank Guinta. Incumbent mayor Joyce Craig, a member of the Democratic Party, had previously unseated former mayor Ted Gatsas in a 2017 rematch after to losing to him in 2015. She had won re-election to a third term in the 2021 Manchester, New Hampshire mayoral election against Victoria Sullivan. Craig, who had previously been considered a likely candidate for Governor of New Hampshire, had been subject to criticism from business owners and residents after the formation of homeless encampments on Pine Street.

Candidates

Declared 
 Jay Ruais (Republican), New Hampshire Army National Guard officer and former chief of staff for then-U.S. Representative Frank Guinta

Declined 
Joyce Craig (Democratic), incumbent mayor
Ted Gatsas (Republican), New Hampshire Executive Councilor from the 4th district and former mayor of Manchester (endorsed Ruais)

Endorsements

References

 21st
21st century in New Hampshire